Fay Devlin is a former Gaelic footballer for the Ardboe club and the Tyrone county team. He played in the 1995 All-Ireland Senior Football Championship Final and won an All Stars Award that year. He is a native of Ardboe in Tyrone.

Honours
 3 Ulster Under-21 Football Championships (1991, 1992, 1993)
 2 All-Ireland Under-21 Football Championships (1991, 1992)
 2 Ulster Senior Football Championships (1995, 1996)
 1 All Star (1995)
 1 Irish News Ulster All Star (1995)

References

Year of birth missing (living people)
Living people
Tyrone inter-county Gaelic footballers